Ernst Georg Johnsson (2 March 1902 – 31 May 1960) was a Swedish road racing cyclist who competed in the 1928 Summer Olympics. He finished 17th in the individual road race and won a team bronze medal.

During his cycling career Johnsson won six national titles: four individual and two with a team. He participated in two world championships, with the best result of 10th place in 1932. Besides cycling he competed nationally in cross-country skiing. In retirement he ran a bicycle shop.

References 

1902 births
1960 deaths
Swedish male cyclists
Olympic cyclists of Sweden
Cyclists at the 1928 Summer Olympics
Olympic bronze medalists for Sweden
Olympic medalists in cycling
People from Östersund Municipality
Medalists at the 1928 Summer Olympics
Sportspeople from Jämtland County
20th-century Swedish people